John Joseph Jeremiah Canvin (182220 January 1890) was a 19th-century Sandy Hook Maritime pilot. He was one of the oldest pilots in the service having served 45 years guiding ships safely into the Port of New York. In one of the more notable pilot disasters, he slipped over the icy deck into the sea after boarding the barkentine Edward Cushing, off Highland Light in 1890.

Early life

John J. Canvin Sr., was born in Bedford, England in 1822. He was the son of James Cunvin and Deborah Ford. He came to America from Bristol, England when he was a young man. He was married three times and had thirteen children. 

One son, Captain John J. Canvin Jr., a pilot on the pilot boat Richard K. Fox, No. 8, died on September 19, 1897 when he boarded the steamship Idaho. He died of heart disease shortly after climbing the robe ladder to board the vessel. 

Another son, William Canvin, died in 1878 by falling from the masthead of the pilot-boat Charles H. Marshall, No. 3.

Career

Canvin was one of the oldest pilots in the service having served 45 years guiding ships safely into the Port of New York. He started in the pilot service as a pilot on the pilot boat Joseph N. Lord, No. 6. 

He got his pilot's license in 1846. Canvin was a pilot and one of the owners of the pilot-boat Charles H. Marshall, No 3. He was a pilot on the Marshall from 1860 to 1890. 

In 1883, he and his son John Canvin, Jr., were owners and pilots on the Ariel Patterson, No. 12. On March 5, 1883, the Ariel Patterson, was run down and sank off Sea Bright, New Jersey by the steamer Commonwealth. John Canvin, Sr., John Canvin, Jr. and the rest of the crew were rescued by the Commonwealth and brought to port.

Death

On January 22, 1890, John J. Canvin Sr., boarded the barquentine Edward Cushing, of Camden, Maine, from the pilot-boat No. 3, Charles H. Marshall. The vessel was off Highland Light and could not enter the harbor that night so had to anchor until daylight. Canvin was on deck when a heavy storm developed and the vessel rolled to one side. Canvin lost his balance and slipped over the railing into the sea. Efforts to find him showed that he had drowned. His son, John Canvin, Jr., was in the shipping office on South Street when he heard the news. Canvin was 68 years old and one of the oldest pilots in the service. His widow and four children survived him.

See also
 List of Northeastern U. S. Pilot Boats

References 

 

Sea captains
Maritime pilotage
1890 deaths
1822 births
People from Bedford